Linhares is the name of a municipality in the state of Espírito Santo, Brazil,  north of the state capital, Vitória. It is the largest municipality by area in the state, at 9,501.6 km², and has a population of 176,688 people (2020).

The municipality is named in honor of D. Rodrigo de Souza Coutinho, Count of Linhares, who was a minister in the Brazilian government in the first two decades of the 19th century. The city took international knowledge, being the residence of Miss Gay Brazil 2013 and 2014.

History
The area today known as Linhares was once inhabited by the Botocudo. The town, founded by Europeans on August 22, 1800 was destroyed by the Indians during a war in 1809.

The area was visited by Brazilian Emperor Dom Pedro II in 1860. An island he set foot on is still known as the Emperor's Island.

Linhares became a municipality in 1945, when it was detached from the municipality of Colatina.

Economy
The economy of Linhares is mostly based on commerce, agriculture, cattle and oil.

Geography
Linhares is characterized by undulating lowlands and numerous lakes. The town sits on the Doce River amidst its 69 lakes.

The climate is hot, tropical, and humid, typically with a dry winter season and a more humid summer. The main freshwater lagoons in the region are: Japaranã-Mirim,  Palmas, Durão, Palminhas, Aguiá, Monsarás, Limão, Feia, Combóios, Piabanha, Óleo, Pau Grosso, Terra Alta and Patrão.

The Juparanã Lagoon (freshwater) is also the second largest in water volume in the country.

There is an official nudist beach called Barra Seca 60 km to the east of Linhares.

The municipality contains part of the  Comboios Biological Reserve, a fully protected area.
It also contains part of the  Sooretama Biological Reserve, a strictly protected conservation unit created in 1982 when two earlier units were merged.
It contains the  Goytacazes National Forest, created in 2002.

References

Areias Brancas, Linhares 
Guia do Turista

External links 
 
 

Populated places established in 1800
Populated coastal places in Espírito Santo
Municipalities in Espírito Santo